The long-tailed house bat or long-tailed serotine bat (Eptesicus hottentotus) is a species of vesper bat found in Kenya, Lesotho, Malawi, Mozambique, Namibia, South Africa, Zambia, and Zimbabwe. It is found in savanna, subtropical or tropical dry shrubland, Mediterranean-type shrubby vegetation, rocky areas, and caves.

References

Eptesicus
Taxa named by Andrew Smith (zoologist)
Taxonomy articles created by Polbot
Mammals described in 1833
Bats of Africa